, better known by his ring name Yo-Hey (stylised in all capital letters), is a Japanese professional wrestler, currently signed to Pro Wrestling Noah (Noah).

Fujita started his career in Dragon Gate (DG) under the ring name Ryoma (stylised in all capitals); his ring name being a tribute to former Japanese movement leader Ryoma Sakamoto. In 2009, Fujita left Dragon Gate due to an animal abuse scandal, and took an extended hiatus from professional wrestling until he returned in 2011 for Smash. He later wrestled for Wrestling New Classic (WNC) until 2013 when he left to become a freelancer, before signing with Noah in September 2017.

Early life
Fujita has a background in Shorinji Kempo, baseball, soccer, and judo. After graduating from the Human Academy Sports College, he began training in the Dragon Gate dojo.

Professional wrestling career

Dragon Gate (2008–2009)
Fujita made his debut in Dragon Gate (DG) under his real name on December 22, 2008, against Kenshin Chikano. On March 20, 2009, during a Nex show, he joined Warriors-5 and changed his ring name to RYOMA in tribute to Ryoma Sakamoto. In mid 2009, an animal abuse scandal was causing an uproar in Dragon Gate surrounding the pet monkey, Cora. Fujita was one of the accused wrestlers who were involved in the abuse of Cora, and was put on an indefinite disciplinary measure. Then, Fujita announced his retirement from pro-wrestling due to the issues that were surrounding the whole situation.

Smash and Wrestling New Classic (2011–2013)
In 2011, Fujita moved to the United States for a short stay in the Funaki Dojo, run by Sho Funaki. He would then return to Japan under the ring name Yo-Hey, and received a tryout match in Smash which he passed. He made his re-debut in 2011, losing to Akira, but would leave Smash later in the year due to a disagreement between Smash owner Tajiri and financial backer Masakazu Sakai. After that, he debuted in Wrestling New Classic alongside Yusuke Kodama, losing to Mikey Whipwreck and Tajiri on May 26, 2012. He left WNC to become a freelancer in 2013.

All Japan Pro Wrestling (2012, 2014–2016)
In 2012, he began competing in All Japan Pro Wrestling (AJPW) under the ring name Gillette, participating the 2012 AJPW Junior Tag League with Kai, finishing with 4 points and failing to make it to the finals. He would return participating in the 2012 Junior Hyper League finishing his block with 2 points and failing to advance. After that, he would make sporadic appearances as Yo-Hey until 2016 when he made his last appearance, teaming with Sushi and losing to Billyken Kid and Toru.

Freelancer (2013–2017)
After he left Wrestling New Classic (WNC) in 2013, he began making appearances in Doutonbori Pro Wrestling (DPW) and participated in the 2013 Doutonbori Tag King Decision League with Hayata finishing with 8 points but failing to advance to the finals. He would later begin making appearances in Dove Pro Wrestling (Dove Pro), where he participated in the tournament to crown the new #1 contenders to the Dove Pro Tag Team Championship where he and Ippei made in to the finals but lost to Billyken Kid and Rey Paloma. In 2014, he participated in the Dotonbori Saikyou Otoko Tournament, losing to Shoichi Uchida in the 2nd round. In July 2015, he took part in a tryout with WWE. On April 2, 2016, he won his first championship with Kenshin Chikano as the Gingin Boys, defeating Black Buffalo and Tsubasa and Gunso and Hayata for the Dove Pro Tag Team Championship in a TLC match. They lost the titles to Jun Kasai and GUNSO on November 26. Afterwards, they would split up due to Yo-Hey focus on wrestle in NOAH.

Pro Wrestling Noah (2016–present)
In December 2016, he began appearing in Pro Wrestling Noah (Noah) after president Masayuki Uchida announced that he would allow freelancers to wrestle in Noah. On January 14, 2017, he made his debut in Noah, defeating Rionne Fujiwara. Later in January 2017, Yo-Hey and Hayata defeated Hi69 and Taiji Ishimori. After the match, Yo-Hey and Hayata stated that they wanted a match for the vacant GHC Junior Heavyweight Tag Team Champions. This led to a feud for the vacant GHC Junior Heavyweight Tag Team Championships between XX (Ishimori and Hi69) and Hayata and Yo-Hey. On February 18, he and Hayata failed to capture the vacant GHC Junior Heavyweight Tag Team Champions, losing to Hi69 and Ishimori. Three days later, Hayata and Yo-Hey came together with Daisuke Harada and Tadasuke to form a new stable named Ratel's. On August 26, Yo-Hey and Hayata defeated XX in a rematch to become the new GHC Junior Heavyweight Tag Team Champions. On September 3, Noah announced that Yo-Hey had signed an exclusive contract with the promotion, ending his days as a freelancer.

Championships and accomplishments
Dragon Gate
Open the Triangle Gate Championship (1 time) – with Atsushi Kotoge and Daisuke Harada
Dove Pro Wrestling
Dove Pro Tag Team Championship (1 time) – with Kenshin Chikano
Pro Wrestling Noah
GHC Junior Heavyweight Tag Team Championship (4 times) – with Hayata (2), Atsushi Kotoge (1) and Kzy (1)
Global Junior Heavyweight Tag League (2017, 2018) – with Hayata

References

1993 births
Living people
Sportspeople from Hyōgo Prefecture
Japanese male professional wrestlers
21st-century professional wrestlers
GHC Junior Heavyweight Tag Team Champions
Open the Triangle Gate Champions